The Battle of Ronco was a battle in the Neapolitan War that took place on 21 April 1815 in the village of Ronco, just south of Forlì. The main Neapolitan army, retreating following the disaster at the Battle of Occhiobello, was being pursued by an Austrian corps under the command of Adam Albert von Neipperg. The Neapolitans, commanded by their king, Joachim Murat, turned to check the Austrians at the Ronco River. The Neapolitans rear guard was defeated by a smaller advanced Austrian force, compelling Murat to retreat further south to the Savio River. The Austrians suffered light casualties, whereas nearly 1,000 Neapolitans were killed or wounded and more deserted Murat altogether.

Citations

References

Further reading 
Capt. Batty, An Historical Sketch of the Campaign of 1815, London (1820)
Details of battle at Clash of Steel

External links 

Conflicts in 1815
Battles of the Neapolitan War
Battles involving Austria
Battles involving the Kingdom of Naples
1815 in Italy
1815 in the Austrian Empire
April 1815 events
Ronco
Joachim Murat